Ab Zaminu (also Romanized as Āb Zamīnū and Āb Zaminoo; also known as Āb Zamīna) is a village in Isin Rural District, in the Central District of Bandar Abbas County, Hormozgan Province, Iran. At the 2006 census, its population was 284, in 60 families.

References 

Populated places in Bandar Abbas County